Reality is the debut studio album by British rock band Second Hand, released in 1968. The album is sometimes considered to be one of the first progressive rock recordings, and sometimes as a psychedelic rock/garage rock album which includes only occasional elements of progressive. Most of the album's material was written and recorded in early 1967.

Background
Lyrics of several of the songs, such as ″Denis James The Clown″, ″Ode to D.J.″ and ″The Bath Song″ mention Denis James The Clown and his death. Ken Elliott stated, "I tied up the loose album concept in the persona of Denis James, and at the same time it amused me to think of a disc jockey playing a song about the romantic failure and suicide of someone whose initials were ′DJ′."

Reception

In a retrospective review for Allmusic, Rolf Semprebon commented, "There are lots of long instrumental sections with guitar solos, which is fortunate because Ken Elliott's vocals are the weakest link, and a few of his song arrangements come off a little dated as well. Fortunately, those aspects are not enough to distract too much from this otherwise excellent record."

Track listing
Side one
"A Fairy Tale" (Ken Elliott) - 3:18
"Rhubarb!" (Elliott, Bob Gibbons) - 3:42
"Denis James the Clown" (Arthur Kitchener) - 2:21
"Steam Tugs" (Elliott) - 3:16
"Good Old '59 (We Are Slowly Gettin' Older)" (Elliott) - 2:19
"The World Will End Yesterday" (Elliott, Gibbons) - 3:51

Side two

Bonus tracks on 2007 re-issue

Personnel
Second Hand
Ken Elliott - organ, pianos, harpsichord, mellotron, lead vocals
Bob Gibbons - guitars
Kieran O'Connor - drums, percussion
Arthur Kitchener - bass guitar (on tracks 2, 6, 8, 10)
Nick South - bass guitar (on tracks 1, 3, 5, 6, 9)

Additional personnel
Chris Williams - cello, flute, saxophone
anonymous vocal group - backing vocals
Vic Keary - producer, engineer (assisted by Mike Craig)

References

Second Hand (band) albums
1968 albums